The Good Bad Girl is a 1931 American romance film based on a novel by Winifred Van Duzer.

Cast
 Mae Clarke as Marcia Cameron
 James Hall as Bob Henderson
 Marie Prevost as Trixie Barnes
 Robert Ellis as Dapper Dan Tyler
 Nance O'Neil as Mrs. J.P. Henderson
 James Donlan as Police Sgt. Donovan
 Paul Porcasi as Tony Pagano
 Wheeler Oakman as Moreland

References

External links 

1930s romance films
American black-and-white films
American romance films
Films directed by Roy William Neill
1930s American films